The Kazan State Finance and Economics Institute (KSFEI) is an Institute in the city of Kazan of the Republic of Tatarstan, Russia.

Overview
The institution was founded in 1931. It evolved from the Faculty of Economics of the Kazan State University named after Vladimir Lenin.

The Institute offers Undergraduate (Bachelor's), Postgraduate  (Master's) and Research (PhD) degrees. It also offers  Higher Education degrees for people already holding University degrees. These are offered in Management of Enterprise, Finance and Credits, Accounting and Audit.

There are six faculties in the Institute:
 Faculty of General Economics
 Faculty of Management
 Faculty of Finance and Credits
 Faculty of the Economy of Enterprise
 Faculty of Part-time Education
 Faculty of Re-training Graduates

In 2002 the Institute started to offer the MBA program.

At the moment there are 3,500 full-time students and 279 academic members of staff.

References

Economics schools
Education in Kazan
Educational institutions established in 1931
1931 establishments in the Soviet Union